Ardgay   ( or Àird Ghaoithe) ["high wind" - see below Further reading: MacGregor] is a small Scottish village on the south west shore of the Dornoch Firth, Sutherland and is 1 mile south from Bonar Bridge and lies at the entrance to Strathcarron, the valley of the River Carron and is at the mouth of the Kyle of Sutherland.

In the Highland Council area, Ardgay is in Ward 1, the  North, West and Central Sutherland ward. The Ardgay & District Community Council serves the area. Ardgay is also the postal town for the area covered by IV24, even although Bonar Bridge is a larger settlement and provides the Delivery Office for the IV24 local area.

Ardgay is served by Ardgay railway station. The hamlet of Kincardine lies less than 1 mile south east along the A836 coast road.  
National Cycle Route 1 passes through Ardgay.

References

Further reading
MacGregor, Alasdair Alpin The Goat Wife: Portrait of a Village. London: William Heinemann, 1939.
--do.--Revised and enlarged. London: Museum Press, 1951.
Stephen Copley, et al.  The Kyle of Sutherland: a brief history. Kyle of Sutherland Heritage Society, 2015.

External links
Community Council Website
Alladale Wilderness Reserve
Croick Church
KoSH Ardgay based history & cultural society

Populated places in Sutherland